Saccharomyces florentinus is a yeast which was previously known as Saccharomyces pyriformis.

It is a component of the ginger beer plant used in the making of traditional ginger beer.

References

External links

Yeasts
Fungal strawberry diseases
Fungi described in 1952
florentinus
Ginger beer